Tent House may refer to

 Tent House, an imprint of Giza Studio
 Tent House, Mount Isa

See also 
 Tent house, regimental arsenal building used in Norway